The PEN/Edward and Lily Tuck Award for Paraguayan Literature is awarded by the PEN America (formerly PEN American Center) to honor an author of a major work of Paraguayan literature and the English translator. The award was established by author Lily Tuck to assist with the translation of Paraguayan literature from Spanish or Guarani into English.  Tuck won a National Book Award in 2004 for The News from Paraguay, which was set in 19th century Paraguay. Michael Orthofer of complete review called it "my new favorite American literary award," for its coverage of an overlooked area of world literature.

Candidates are nominated by Paraguayan publishers.

The award is one of many PEN awards sponsored by International PEN in over 145 PEN centers around the world. The PEN American Center awards have been characterized as being among the "major" American literary prizes.

Winners

References

External links
PEN/Edward and Lily Tuck Award for Paraguayan Literature

PEN America awards
Awards established in 2010
2010 establishments in the United States
Translation awards
Paraguayan literary awards